Raqqa Governorate is one of the fourteen governorates of Syria. It is situated in the north of the country and covers an area of 19,618 km2. The capital is Raqqa. The Islamic State of Iraq and Levant claimed full control of this province as of August 24, 2014 when its fighters captured Tabqa Airbase in the southwest part of the province. However, the Syrian Democratic Forces now control much of the province; all of the area north of the Euphrates River including the provincial capital of Raqqa and the city of al-Thawrah are under SDF control, with the government holding the southern part of the governorate after a successful offensive was launched with the aid of Liwa al-Quds, tribal militias and Russian air support, which resulted in the recapture of the city of Resafa, and the capture of many oil fields in Ar-Raqqah province, including various oil and gas stations.

History

Modern Syria (1946–2011)
Al-Rashid Governorate (named after Harun al-Rashid) was separated from the neighbouring Deir ez-Zor Governorate on 17 November 1957, during the reign of President Shukri al-Quwatli. The Governorate was later renamed on 1 January 1970 to Raqqa Governorate.

Syrian Civil War (2011-present)
As of 19 September 2012, the town of Tal Abyad, directly across the border from the Turkish town of Akçakale, was already under rebel control.

On 11 February 2013, Syrian rebels, including al-Nusra fighters, took control of the Tabqa Dam, and Tabqa city, according to SOHR and videos posted by rebels. Tabqa Dam, on the Euphrates river, is the largest hydroelectric dam in Syria and provides electricity to many areas, including Aleppo. Tabqa is also known as Thawrah.

As of September 2014, governance has been fully reestablished with previous personnel who pledge allegiance to the new regime. Only the police and soldiers are ISIL fighters, who receive confiscated lodging previously owned by non-Sunnis and others who fled. ISIL asserts that it is providing welfare services, that it has established price controls, and that it has imposed taxes on the wealthy. The Raqqa Dam continued to provide electricity and water. The exportation of oil brought in tens of millions of dollars.

As of July 2017, the Syrian Democratic Forces occupy the majority of the province, including the city of Raqqa, which they have captured from ISIL following a months-long siege. A few months before the capture of Raqqa, the Syrian government launched the Southern Raqqa offensive, which cleared southern Raqqa and southeastern Aleppo from ISIL militants. With the south part of the governorate under government control and the northern part under Rojava, the governorate has been fully cleared from ISIL.

Geography

Settlements
Raqqa is the provincial capital; other major settlements include Abu Hamad, Abu Susah, Al Hawrah, Al Qaltah, Al-Sabkhah, Al-Thawrah, Ar Ruhayyat, Ar Rusafah, Ath Thadyayn, Bash Dulki, Dulq Maghar, Fatsat ath Thayb, Hamrat Nasir, Jubb al Abyad, Kasrat Muraybit, Ma'adan, Matir, Nasiriyah, Suluk and Tell Abyad.

Districts

The governorate is divided into three districts (manatiq). The districts are further divided into ten sub-districts (nawahi):

 Raqqa District (4 sub-districts)
 Raqqa Subdistrict
 Al-Sabkhah Subdistrict
 Al-Karamah Subdistrict
 Maadan Subdistrict

 Tell Abyad District (3 sub-districts)
 Tell Abyad Subdistrict
 Suluk Subdistrict
 Ayn Issa Subdistrict
 Al-Thawrah District (3 sub-districts)
 Al-Thawrah Subdistrict
 Al-Mansurah Subdistrict
 Al-Jarniyah Subdistrict

Demographics
As per the 2004 Syrian census the population was 793,500. A 2011 UNOCHA estimate put the population at 944,000, though this has likely changed since the start of the war.

References

External links
eraqqa The First Complete website for Raqqa news and services

 
Governorates of Syria
Upper Mesopotamia